The Northern Illinois Huskies football team are a college football program representing Northern Illinois University (NIU) in the Football Bowl Subdivision (FBS) of college football. NIU football plays its home games at Huskie Stadium on the campus of the Northern Illinois University in DeKalb, Illinois.

The Huskies compete in the Mid-American Conference (MAC) as a member of the West Division, where they have won six championships in 1983, 2011, 2012, 2014, 2018, and 2021. They have played in twelve post-season bowl games since 2004, most notably the 2013 Orange Bowl.

History

Early history
NIU's football program was established in the late 19th century, playing its first ever game against DeKalb High School in 1899 and was led by coach John L. Keith to the team's first ever victory. NIU started out in the independent scene from 1899 through 1919 before joining the Illinois Intercollegiate Athletic Conference. The team became independent again in 1925. NIU returned to the Illinois Intercollegiate Athletic Conference in 1928 and finished the season winless for the first time. In 1929 however, Chick Evans took over as the head football coach and immediately twisted the downhill fate of his team as he led his squad to a 6–1–1 record. Evans led the Huskies to continuous winning seasons since his take over, and his efforts paid off in 1938 as NIU captured the Illinois Intercollegiate Athletic Conference Championship, the team's first title. He followed it up with three more championships (1941, '44, and '46) and even led the Huskies' to a back-to-back bowl game appearance in 1946 and 1947.

In 1950, the Illinois Intercollegiate Athletic Conference, which had dwindled down to only five members (NIU, SIU, EIU, WIU, and ISU) accepted its first members from out of state and changed its name to the Interstate Intercollegiate Athletic Conference. With the exception of the spotless season (9–0–0) in 1951 that earned the team a 5th conference title, NIU failed to make a decent showing during the first few years in the newly named conference. Howard Fletcher though had other plans as he picked up the pieces of the miserable 0–8–1 season from Robert Kahler in 1956. The Huskies' had a slow progress that picked up in the late 1950s. The team's third bowl game appearance in 1962, although a loss, was only the beginning of good things to come as in the following season, the Huskies completed their sixth undefeated season which earned them the Interstate Intercollegiate Athletic Conference Championship, an AP College Division National championship selection, and a ticket to the prestigious Mineral Water Bowl which the team eventually won over Missouri State. The team made it a three-peat championship, adding up the 1964 and 1965 conference titles. NIU became independent from 1966 through '72 before joining the Mid-American Athletic Conference in 1973. The team claimed the MAC title in 1983 then went on to their first Bowl Game in the Division I-A, the California Bowl, which the Huskies won over Cal State-Fullerton. The team left the MAC after the 1985 season and first became independent from 1986 to 1992, then joined the Big West Conference from 1993 through '95, becoming independent again in '96, then finally was admitted back into the Mid-American Conference in 1997.

Joe Novak era (1996–2007)
Joe Novak took over the Huskies program in December 1995, and coached his first NIU game in September 1996. The first three years of Novak's tenure proved to be tumultuous, as his Huskies squads won a total of three games between 1996 and 1998. Despite this, Novak kept his job and turned the program around. On October 17, 1998, the Huskies broke their epic losing streak, by defeating Central Michigan University 17–6. The student body tore down the goal posts, and carried them down Lincoln Highway, planting the goal posts in a campus lagoon. University president John LaTourette personally paid to have new goal posts installed. In 1999, NIU won 5 games, and in 2000 Novak started a string of seven consecutive winning seasons, going 6–5 in both 2000 and 2001. After a 1–3 start to the 2002 season, fans began to see the fruits of Novak's labor as the team ripped off 7 consecutive wins, and only a 33–30 loss in their final game against rival Toledo prevented a MAC Championship Game appearance.

Optimism was high to start the 2003 season, with 12 returning starters including prospect and future NFL players Michael Turner, Doug Free, Brad Cieslak, P. J. Fleck, Dan Sheldon, Keith Perry, Vinson Reynolds, Akil Grant, Randee Drew, and Travis Moore. On opening weekend, the Huskies beat No. 15 Maryland, 20–13, in overtime. Then, the Huskies traveled to Tuscaloosa and beat No. 21 Alabama, 16–13. After beating Iowa State the following week, the Huskies were rolling and won their first 7 games. Following their week 5 win against Ohio, the first BCS standings were released, and by week 7 the Huskies had climbed to No. 10 overall. Novak and the Huskies could not keep that momentum going, as they lost in week 8 at No. 22 Bowling Green, which also featured the first ever ESPN GameDay appearance for a MAC football game. The Huskies lost one more game in 2003, to Toledo, finishing the year 10–2, unranked, and uninvited to a bowl game.

Novak's 2004 and 2006 teams both went to bowl games. The 2004 team went to the Silicon Valley Classic in San Jose, California and was the first Huskies team to go bowling in 21 years. The Huskies fell behind early, 14–0, to a Troy team that featured DeMarcus Ware, but were able to rally behind future NFL running back Garrett Wolfe and the accurate passing of Josh Haldi to win, 34–21. In 2006, Wolfe and company returned to a bowl, the Poinsettia Bowl, against TCU and lost 37–7.

Novak's final year was a tough one, winning only 2 games and finishing at the bottom of the MAC West. Overall Novak won 63 games as the Huskies' head coach. He currently is retired and resides in North Carolina.

The Huskies finished the 2007 season having produced a 1,000-yard rusher in the previous nine consecutive seasons, starting in 1999, including rushers Thomas Hammock, Michael Turner, Garrett Wolfe and Justin Anderson.

Jerry Kill era (2008–2010)
Jerry Kill was hired to replace the retiring Joe Novak after the 2007 season. Kill was previously the head coach at Southern Illinois University, an FCS football program, making NIU his first FBS head coaching job. Kill led the Huskies to three straight bowl appearances in his three years as head coach, all three with quarterback Chandler Harnish. In 2010, Kill led the Huskies to the MAC Championship, but NIU fell to Miami (Ohio). On December 5, 2010, the day after NIU's loss in the MAC Championship, Kill tendered his immediate resignation and accepted the position of head coach of the Minnesota Golden Gophers. Coach Kill's resignation would leave harsh feelings in the Huskie locker room, as the players learned of his resignation through email. This left the Huskies without a coach, less than two weeks before they were to appear in the 2010 Humanitarian Bowl.

Despite Kill's departure, the Huskies won their bowl game, defeating Fresno State in the 2010 Humanitarian Bowl.

Dave Doeren era (2011–2012) 
On December 13, 2010, Dave Doeren was named the new head coach. The Huskies went 11–3 in his first season and they won their first MAC Championship since 1983 in a 23–20 comeback win against Ohio, while also defeating the Arkansas State Red Wolves in a come-from-behind game in the 2012 GoDaddy.com Bowl.

Inclusive of the 2012 season, NIU has won 10 conference and three division titles, appeared in 13 Division I-A and College Division bowl games (winning five), has accumulated 535 wins, and has an all-time winning percentage of .533.

2012 ended up being another memorable season in DeKalb, with the emergence of quarterback Jordan Lynch. Lynch was replacing Huskie QB Chandler Harnish, the decorated NIU starting QB for the previous three years. There was hope that Lynch would be a good quarterback, but no one could have predicted what Lynch ended up doing in the 2012 campaign. Lynch ended the season passing for 2962 yards, 24 touchdowns with five interceptions. He also ran for 1751 yards and 19 rushing touchdowns. The 1751 rushing yards were the most ever by a quarterback in the FBS at the time, surpassing a record set in 2011 by Denard Robinson of the University of Michigan. Lynch's marquee game was on November 14 against Toledo, where Lynch threw for 407 yards and three touchdowns, while rushing for another 162 yards. Lynch lead the Huskies to an 11–1 record, a No. 21 ranking in the BCS poll and their third consecutive MAC West Divisional Championship. In the MAC Championship Game, NIU defeated No. 17 Kent State Golden Flashes 44–37 score in double overtime. Lynch scored the game-winning touchdown in overtime. The win eventually propelled the team to No. 15 in the BCS Standings, granting them their first-ever appearance in a BCS bowl game, the 2013 Orange Bowl against Florida State.

The day after the MAC Championship game, Doeren was hired as the new head coach for North Carolina State University. Rod Carey took over and coached the Huskies in the Orange Bowl, but NIU eventually lost 31–10 to the Seminoles. The Orange Bowl was the first of Carey's six bowl losses: Orange Bowl (2013), Poinsettia Bowl (2013 & 2015), the Boca Raton Bowl (2014 & 2018), and the Quick Lane Bowl (2017).

Rod Carey era (2013–2018) 

Following a bitter end to the 2012 campaign, NIU looked to build their momentum in 2013. In front of two sellout crowds, the Huskies increased their NCAA record home win streak to 26 games. Following the conclusion of the regular season, NIU was poised to bust the BCS yet again. They sat 12–0 after cruising through their schedule, #14 in the BCS Standings, and were sitting above an AQ conference champion. Jordan Lynch became the first Huskie ever to be invited to the Heisman trophy ceremony in New York, finishing 3rd. Following their regular season, heartbreak happened for the Huskies. They lost both their conference championship, as well as their bowl game (Poinsettia Bowl) to finish the season 12–2, leaving Jordan Lynch with a career record of 24–4.

Following the season, 3 Huskies had All-American honors. Jordan Lynch was a first team all purpose AP All American, Jimmie Ward was a first team Sports Illustrated (second team AP), and Tommylee Lewis was an honorable mention (AP).

In 2014, the Huskies had another strong season despite the departure of Heisman finalist Jordan Lynch and NFL draft picks Jimmie Ward and Ken Bishop. NIU beat Big Ten program Northwestern in September and defeated Bowling Green 51-17 in the MAC Championship Game to win their 3rd MAC title in four seasons. They lost the Boca Raton Bowl to Conference USA Champion Marshall 52-23. The Huskies finished 11-3, their 5th consecutive season where they won at least 11 games and received votes in the AP Top 25 poll during the season.

In their 3rd game of 2015, the Huskies narrowly lost to defending National Champion and #1 ranked Ohio State 20-13 as 34.5 point underdogs, in a game that the Huskies didn't trail until halfway through the 3rd quarter. NIU rattled off six consecutive wins to start MAC play, including a road win against #20 ranked Toledo, and won the MAC West division title for the 6th consecutive season. NIU ended the season with losses to Bowling Green in the MAC title game (34-14) and Boise State in the Poinsettia Bowl (55-7) where NIU was outgained 654 to 33 yards. Cornerback Shuwan Lurry was selected as a 1st team All-American by several outlets, after finishing the season with an FBS leading nine interceptions.

The following season the Huskies went 5-7, attaining only their 2nd losing season since 2000. In the offseason, Wide Receiver Kenny Golladay was drafted by the Detroit Lions in the 3rd round of the NFL draft after back-to-back 1000 yard receiving seasons for NIU.

On September 16, 2017 the Huskies defeated Nebraska 21-17, giving them a 6-4 record in their last 10 games against Big Ten opponents, 4-1 in their last 5. NIU finished 2017 with an 8-6 record after losing to Duke 36-14 in the Quick Lane Bowl. Defensive lineman Sutton Smith set a Huskie record for sacks (14), and led the nation in tackles for loss (29.5) and quarterback pressures (87). He was named a consensus All-American at the end of the season.

In 2018, NIU clinched its first MAC West division title since 2015. The Huskies defeated Buffalo 30-29 in the MAC Championship game after trailing by 19 points in the 3rd quarter. This was NIU's 4th MAC title since 2011. NIU was defeated by UAB 37-13 in the Boca Raton Bowl, giving NIU their 6th consecutive bowl game loss and 5th bowl game under Rod Carey where they were defeated by at least 21 points. Sutton Smith had another strong season, once again leading the nation in tackles for loss (27) and finishing third in sacks (15). He was named a 1st team All-American for the 2nd straight year by several outlets.

On January 11, 2019, it was announced that Rod Carey had accepted the head coaching position at Temple University after six seasons as NIU's head football coach.

In their search for a new football coach, NIU's potential candidates included Baltimore Ravens RB coach Thomas Hammock (former NIU RB), former Maryland OC Matt Canada (former NIU OC), SMU DC Kevin Kane (former NIU DC), and Wisconsin OC Joe Rudolph.

Thomas Hammock era (2019–present) 

On January 18, 2019, NIU announced the hiring of Thomas Hammock as the new head football coach. Hammock was a running back for the Huskies from 1999-2002 and was most recently the running backs coach for the NFL's Baltimore Ravens from 2014-2018. At his first press conference as NIU's head coach, Hammock stated that coaching at NIU "had always been [his] dream."

In Hammock's first year at the helm, the Huskies finished 5-7 including a 4-4 record in MAC play.
 
In a pandemic shortened 2020 season, NIU finished 0-6 with one of the youngest teams in the nation. This marked their first winless season since 1999.

Expectations were low for the 2021 season following a disappointing 2020. Michigan State QB Rocky Lombardi announced that he would be transferring to NIU in December 2020, and he was named the starting QB to enter the season. NIU opened the year as an 18 point underdog to Georgia Tech, but defeated the Yellow Jackets 22-21. This marked their 12th victory over a Power 5 program since 2000 and 8th since 2009. The Huskies claimed their 5th MAC title since 2011 with a 41-23 victory over Kent State. After their win in the MAC championship, NIU was selected to play in the Cure Bowl against Coastal Carolina, a game they lost 47-41.

Conference affiliations
Northern Illinois has been a member of the following conferences.

 Independent (1899–1919)
 Illinois Intercollegiate Athletic Conference (1922–1925) 
 Independent (1926–1927)
 Illinois Intercollegiate Athletic Conference (1928–1965)
 Independent (1966–1974)
 Mid-American Conference (1975–1985)
 Independent (1986–1992)
 Big West Conference (1993–1995)
 Independent (1996)
 Mid-American Conference (1997–present)

Championships

National championships

Conference championships
Conference championships won by Northern Illinois as of 2021.

† Co-champions

Division championships

† Co-champions

Bowl games
Northern Illinois has played in 14 bowl games, having a record of 4–10.

Other bowl games
In years prior to having classifications for college football, Northern Illinois participated in five bowl games that are now considered as "College Division". They played in five bowl games, having a record of 1–4.

Head coaches
Career records of NIU head coaches.

† Interim head coach for 2010 Humanitarian Bowl

‡ Interim head coach for 2013 Orange Bowl

Rivalries

Ball State

Northern Illinois holds a 25–23–2 series lead over Ball State through the 2022 season.

Individual honors

Retired jerseys 
NIU has not retired any number but has honored the jerseys of four former players retiring them.

College Football Hall of Fame 
There have been two former NIU players inducted into the College Football Hall of Fame.

† Inducted as a coach

Future non-conference opponents 
Announced schedules as of December 6, 2022.

References

External links

 

 
American football teams established in 1899
1899 establishments in Illinois